The Communist Party of Nepal is a political party in Nepal founded in April 2013. The party was formed through the merger of Communist Party of Nepal (Unified), Communist Party of Nepal Marxist−Leninist (Samajbadi), Communist Party of Nepal (United Marxist), Marxist Communist Party of Nepal, Bidrohi ML and the Independent Thought Group. Rishi Kattel is the chairman of the party. Jagat Bahadur Bogati and Lok Narayan Subedi serve as co-chairs of the party, whilst Haridev Gyawali, Ram Bahadur Bhandari and Tanka Rai serve as vice-chairs.

History 
The party was a constituent of a 33-party alliance formed to boycott the election along with Communist Party of Nepal (Revolutionary Maoist) and other parties but In May 2013 the party was registered with the Election Commission of Nepal ahead of the 2013 Constituent Assembly election. It presented 60 candidates in FPTP constituencies. For the Proportional Representation vote the party submitted a list of 100 candidates, headed by Sita Subedi. The election symbol of the party is a hammer and sickle. The party failed to get any seats in the elections.

When the Netra Bikram Chand-led Communist Party of Nepal Maoist changed its name to Nepal Communist Party, Rishi Kattel warned him not to misuse his party's name for illegal activities.

In 2018, when the Nepal Communist Party was formed, it had to change its name to Nepal Communist Party (NCP) as Rishi Kattel's party was already registered with the Election Commission. The party challenged the decision of the Election Commission to register the new party as NCP, as it was close to his own NCP.

Electoral performance

References 

Communist parties in Nepal
Political parties established in 2013
2013 establishments in Nepal